The 2013–14 MSV Duisburg season was the 114th season in the club's football history. In 2013–14 the club played in the 3. Liga, the third tier of German football. Duisburg was forced to play in the 3. Liga after their licence for the 2. Bundesliga was rejected by the DFL.

After it was announced that Duisburg would not play in the 2. Bundesliga in 2013–14, many players left the team, including coach Kosta Runjaić. As a result, Karsten Baumann and the new build front office had to build a new team quickly before the season started. The squad was introduced only ten days before the kickoff of the new season.

They finished 7th in the league and qualified for the 2014–15 DFB-Pokal, after losing in the first round in this year, by winning the Niederrheinpokal.

Results

League table

Results summary

Result round by round

3. Liga

DFB-Pokal

Niederrheinpokal

Friendlies

Squad and statistics

Squad, matches played and goals scored

|}

Discipline

Squad

References

External links

German football clubs 2013–14 season
MSV Duisburg seasons